Parliamentary elections were held in Greece on Sunday, 18 October 1981. PASOK, led by Andreas Papandreou, faced New Democracy, led by Georgios Rallis. Papandreou achieved a landslide and PASOK formed the first socialist government in the history of Greece (in 1963 Centrists had formed a government under the leadership of George Papandreou, Andreas' father, but their party, Center Union, was not a socialist party but a centrist, social-liberal one).

Observers had expected a PASOK victory but were surprised by the size of the victory.

185 of the 300 seats were won by PASOK or the Communist Party: both openly eurosceptic. This was the high point of Greek euroscepticism, coming just months after the country's accession to the European Communities.

Results

Aftermath
Papandreou's new government introduced several interesting reforms in the wake of its victory (legalization of civil wedding, new family law, nationalization of certain private companies, etc.).

The main opposition party, New Democracy, faced serious internal conflicts. Georgios Rallis was forced to resign after the defeat and he was succeeded by Evangelos Averoff, former minister under Karamanlis governments. In 1984 Averof resigned because of health problems and Konstantinos Mitsotakis became the new leader of New Democracy. Noteworthy, Mitsotakis and Papandreou were both centrists before 1967 and they belonged to the same party, George Papandreou's Center Union. Nevertheless, they were strong opponents and they never liked each other. Papandreou was calling Mitsotakis "a defector, an apostate", because in 1965 he defected from the ruling Center Union and participated in a new government pleasing to Constantine II, who had just accepted George Papandreou's resignation after a serious disagreement between the King and the prime minister.

References

Legislative election
Greece
Parliamentary elections in Greece
1980s in Greek politics
Greek
Andreas Papandreou